The 2018 OFC Champions League Final was the final of the 2018 OFC Champions League, the 17th edition of the Oceania Cup, Oceania's premier club football tournament organized by the Oceania Football Confederation (OFC), and the 12th season under the current OFC Champions League name.

The final was contested in two-legged home-and-away format between Team Wellington from New Zealand and Lautoka from Fiji. The first leg was hosted by Team Wellington at David Farrington Park in Wellington on 13 May, while the second leg was hosted by Lautoka FC at Churchill Park in Lautoka on 20 May 2018.

Team Wellington won the tie 10–3 on aggregate for their first OFC Champions League title. As winners, Team Wellington earned the right to represent the OFC at the 2018 FIFA Club World Cup, entering at the first round.

Teams
In the following table, finals until 2006 were in the Oceania Club Championship era, since 2007 were in the OFC Champions League era.

This was Team Wellington's fourth consecutive and overall final appearance. However, they have yet to win the OFC Champions League, having lost to Auckland City in all three of their previous final appearances. This was the first final for Lautoka in their third season in the OFC Champions League.

Venues

Road to the final

Note: In all results below, the score of the finalist is given first (H: home; A: away; N: neutral).

Format
The final was played on a home-and-away two-legged basis, with the order of legs decided by the draw for the knockout stage, which was held on 5 March 2018 at the OFC Headquarters in Auckland, New Zealand.

The away goals rule, extra time and a penalty shoot-out would be used to decide the winner if necessary.

Matches

First leg

Second leg

References

External links
2018 OFC Champions League, oceaniafootball.com

Final
2017
1 Final
2017–18 in New Zealand association football
International association football competitions hosted by New Zealand
International association football competitions hosted by Fiji